The Neighbors' Window is a 2019 American short film written and directed by Marshall Curry. It won the Academy Award for Best Live Action Short Film in 2020. The film was inspired by a true story by Diane Weipert, which she recounted on the podcast Love and Radio.

Plot 
Alli and Jacob are a couple of 30-somethings living in New York City with their three young children. Alli is busy and stressing in nursing the kids, straining her relationship with husband Jacob. Alli's apartment's window faces with an apartment neighbor's window. Alli and Jacob both covertly spy on the couple, bitter about their loss of youth and new responsibilities as parents.

One day, Jacob comments that the neighbor man has "shaved his head" and looks hungover. Shortly after, while Jacob and the kids are out, Alli spies across the street again to find the man in hospice; he dies soon after. Alli goes out to witness the man being taken out in a body bag and finds the wife crying on the sidewalk. The woman reveals that ever since her husband became "sick," they would find comfort in watching the family through the window, much in the way Jacob and Alli did. The two embrace.

The same night, as Jacob and the kids return from the museum, the family interacted with each other with joviality.

Cast 
 Maria Dizzia as Alli
 Greg Keller as Jacob
 Juliana Canfield as The Neighbor
 Bret Lada as The Neighbor's Husband

Awards 
 Won  2020: Academy Award for Best Live Action Short Film
Palm Springs Shorts Fest, Best Live Action Short (Winner - Audience Award)
Casting Society Artios Awards - Short Film Casting (nominee)
Traverse City Film Festival, Best Fiction Short (Winner - Audience Award)
Hollyshorts Film Festival, Best Drama (Winner)
SCAD Savannah Film Festival, Best Narrative Short (Winner)
St. Louis International Film Festival, Best of the Fest (Winner)
Nashville Film Festival, Best Narrative Short (Winner)
Rhode Island Film Festival, Best Live Action Short (Winner) 
Woodstock Film Festival, Best Short Film (Winner)

See also 
 A Night at the Garden, 2018 Oscar-nominated documentary film also directed by Curry
 Rear Window, 1954 Alfred Hitchcock film to which critics compare The Neighbors' Window

References

External links 
 
 
 

2019 short films
Films directed by Marshall Curry
Films set in New York City
Films shot in New York City
American short films
2019 films
Live Action Short Film Academy Award winners
2010s English-language films